Hatthaporn Suwan (born February 23, 1984) is a Thai former footballer. He last played for Thai Premier League side Esan United. Hatthaporn retired from professional football in 2012, due to injuries.

Honours

 Thailand Premier League 2004/05 with Thailand Tobacco Monopoly FC
 Thailand Premier League 2009 with Muang Thong United

International career

Hatthaporn made his international debut against Singapore in ASEAN Football Championship 2007 (4 Feb 2007) and has also be used as a substitute against the same opposition, but so far has failed to break into the side on a regular basis.

References
National Team Players

1984 births
Living people
Hatthaporn Suwan
Hatthaporn Suwan
Hatthaporn Suwan
Hatthaporn Suwan
Hatthaporn Suwan
Hatthaporn Suwan
Hatthaporn Suwan
Hatthaporn Suwan
Hatthaporn Suwan
2007 AFC Asian Cup players
Association football midfielders
Footballers at the 2006 Asian Games
Hatthaporn Suwan

ar:سارايوت تشايكامدي